Olli Pousi (born 23 July 1959) is a retired Finnish triple jumper. He competed in the men's triple jump at the 1980 Summer Olympics albeit without registering a valid mark.

References

1959 births
Living people
Athletes (track and field) at the 1980 Summer Olympics
Finnish male triple jumpers
Olympic athletes of Finland
Sportspeople from Espoo